Mahanoy Area Junior Senior High School is located at 1 Golden Bear Drive in Mahanoy City, Pennsylvania. In 2016, enrollment was 271 pupils in grades 9th-12.

Extracurriculars
Mahanoy Area High School offers a wide variety of clubs, activities, and an extensive sports program.

Sports
Mahanoy Area High School sports include:

Boys
Baseball - AA
Basketball- AA
Cross Country - A
Football - AA
Golf - AA
Swimming and Diving  - AA
Track and Field - AA
Wrestling	- AA

Girls
Basketball - AA
Cross Country - A
Golf - AA
Softball - A
Swimming and Diving  - AA
Track and Field - AA
Volleyball - A

According to PIAA directory July 2016

References

Public high schools in Pennsylvania
Schools in Schuylkill County, Pennsylvania